Yoshino Maru (Kanji:) was an 8,950-ton Japanese troop transport and hospital ship during World War II, which sank on 31 July 1944 with great loss of life.

Yoshino Maru was built in 1907 as Kleist for the Norddeutscher Lloyd by the Schichau-Werke in  Danzig, Germany. Laid up for the duration of WWI at Padang, Sumatra, Netherlands East Indies.
In 1919, she was taken over by the United Kingdom, who transferred her as a War Reparation in 1922 to the Japanese government, where she was renamed Yoshino Maru. In 1929, she was sold to Kinkai Yusen and used as an ocean liner. 
At the start of the Second Sino-Japanese War, she was chartered, later requisitioned, as a transport ship by the Imperial Japanese Navy. She began use as a hospital ship September, 1942. On 26 January 1944 40 nm north of Rabaul, she was bombed and suffered a near-miss by an American patrol aircraft at 03-45S 151-42E. on 21 April, 1944 Japan's Ministry of Foreign Affairs submitted a protest to the United States about the bombing of the hospital ship.

In July, 1944 she became a troopship again. On 31 July 1944, she was travelling in Convoy MI-11 from Moji, Japan, to Miri, Borneo, with 5,063 soldiers on board, when the convoy was attacked by a United States Navy submarine wolfpack. At 3:40 AM,   torpedoed and sank Yoshino Maru with four torpedoes; losses aboard ship included 2,442 soldiers, as well as 18 gunners, 35 crewmen, and 400 cubic meters (14,120 cubic feet) of ammunition.

See also 
 List by death toll of ships sunk by submarines
 List of battles and other violent events by death toll

References

Ships of the NYK Line
Ships of Norddeutscher Lloyd
1906 ships
Ships built in Danzig
Ships built by Schichau
World War I merchant ships of Germany
World War II merchant ships of Japan
Ships sunk by American submarines
Maritime incidents in July 1944